1/8 or  or ⅛ may refer to:

 January 8 (month-day date notation)
 1 August (day-month date notation)
the Fraction one eighth, 0.125 in decimal, and 12.5% in percentage
1st Battalion, 8th Marines
1s. 8d. i.e. 1 shilling and 8 (old) pence in UK pre-decimal currency = 20d. or 1⁄12 of a Pound sterling

See also
 8th
 Eighth (disambiguation)
 8 (disambiguation)
 Okta